The NMBS/SNCB Type 29 was a class of  steam locomotives built between 1945 and 1946.  The class was ordered and used to help revive the operations of the National Railway Company of Belgium (NMBS/SNCB) following World War II.   The locomotives were built in Canada and the United States, and supplied to Belgium under the auspices of what later became known as the Marshall Plan.

One member of the class, no. 29.013, has been preserved by the NMBS/SNCB for display at Train World, the Belgian national railway museum at Schaarbeek railway station in north-central Brussels.

See also

History of rail transport in Belgium
List of SNCB/NMBS classes
Rail transport in Belgium
China Railways KD7

References

 

2-8-0 locomotives
ALCO locomotives
CLC locomotives
MLW locomotives
29
Railway locomotives introduced in 1945
Steam locomotives of Belgium
Standard gauge locomotives of Belgium
1′D h2 locomotives